Agni Baltsa (also known as Agnes Baltsa; born 19 November 1944) is a leading Greek mezzo-soprano singer.

Baltsa was born in Lefkada. She began playing piano at the age of six, before moving to Athens in 1958 to concentrate on singing. She graduated from the Greek National Conservatoire in 1965 and then travelled to Munich to continue studying on a Maria Callas scholarship.

Baltsa made her first appearance in an opera in 1968 as Cherubino in The Marriage of Figaro at Frankfurt Opera, before going on to appear as Octavian in Der Rosenkavalier at the Vienna State Opera in 1970. Under the guidance of Herbert von Karajan, she became a regular at the prestigious Salzburg Festival. She became Kammersängerin of the Vienna State Opera in 1980.

Her best-known performance is that of Carmen by Georges Bizet, which she has sung a number of times with noted tenors such as José Carreras, Neil Shicoff, and others. She has also sung works by Mozart (notably Così fan tutte), Rossini (Il Barbiere di Siviglia, La Cenerentola, Semiramide, L'italiana in Algeri), Mascagni (Cavalleria Rusticana), Saint-Saëns (Samson et Dalila), Verdi (Aida, La forza del destino, Il trovatore, Don Carlos), Bellini (I Capuleti e i Montecchi), Offenbach (Les Contes d'Hoffmann) and Donizetti (Il Campanello, Maria Stuarda).

She starred in the Austrian film Duett in 1992, playing an opera singer.

In 2017, she sang Klytemnestra in Richard Strauss's Elektra at the Greek National Opera's new premises at the Stavros Niarchos Foundation Cultural Center.

References

External links 
Fan club site

Discography at SonyBMG Masterworks

1944 births
Living people
Grammy Award winners
Greek mezzo-sopranos
Members of the European Academy of Sciences and Arts
Operatic mezzo-sopranos
People from Lefkada
Österreichischer Kammersänger
20th-century Greek women opera singers
21st-century Greek women opera singers

Deutsche Grammophon artists
EMI Classics and Virgin Classics artists
Philips Records artists
Sony Classical Records artists